The Monadnock-Sunapee Greenway (MSG) is a  hiking trail that traverses the highlands of southern New Hampshire from Mount Monadnock in Jaffrey to Mount Sunapee in Newbury. The trail is maintained primarily through the efforts of the Monadnock-Sunapee Greenway Trail Club.

Notable features along the route include the summit of Mount Monadnock; Eliza Adams Gorge; the classic New England town commons of Nelson and Washington; the New Hampshire Audubon Society's Nye Meadow Refuge; Otter Brook and Andorra Forest; the high heath barrens of Pitcher Mountain, Hubbard Hill, and Jackson Hill; Lovewell Mountain;  of the Sunapee Ridge; and Lake Solitude, a mountaintop tarn near the summit of Mount Sunapee. A number of lakes, reservoirs, ponds, and other wetlands are also located along the route.

Trail description

The MSGT extends from the summit of Mount Monadnock to the summit of Mount Sunapee through Cheshire County, Sullivan County, and Merrimack County. The MSG passes through the following incorporated communities: Jaffrey, Dublin, Harrisville, Nelson, Stoddard, Washington, Goshen, and Newbury, New Hampshire.  

Mount Monadnock, the southern terminus of the MSG, is the most prominent peak of southeast New England. Its bare, rocky summit provides expansive views. Eliza Adams Gorge is a scenic and rocky eastern hemlock-clad ravine located just below the dam spillway on Howe Reservoir. The Nye Meadow Refuge is an important great blue heron rookery managed by the Audubon Society of New Hampshire. Otter Brook and Andorra Forest, collectively the largest conservation area in southwest New Hampshire, are cooperatively managed by The Nature Conservancy and the Society for the Protection of New Hampshire Forests and include extensive tracts of northern hardwood forest, wetlands, and rare plant communities. Pitcher Mountain, Hubbard Hill, and Jackson Hill, offer wide views from upland heath barrens and blueberry fields.

Lovewell Mountain, is a rugged monadnock contiguous with the southern part of Sunapee Ridge; several scenic outlooks on ledges provide views of the surrounding countryside. Mount Sunapee, is the high point of a mountainous  ridgeline that spans four towns. The ridge offers scenic vistas from more than a dozen distinct peaks along its length and from the Mount Sunapee ski area on the summit. Other notable peaks along its length include White Ledges, which overlooks Lake Solitude; Lucia's Lookout, ; an unnamed southern summit, ; and Kittredge Hill, . The commons of Washington and Nelson are small and bucolic classic New England town centers with little commercial development and with architecture dating back to the early 19th century. Washington, is the highest incorporated town in New Hampshire; it is  higher than the next-highest town, the ski resort community of Waterville Valley

Notable bodies of water along the trail route include Seavers Reservoir, Howe Reservoir, Chesham Pond, Silver Lake, Childs Bog, Center Pond, Halfmoon Pond, and the mountaintop Lake Solitude. 

The MSG is primarily used for hiking, backpacking, and in the winter, snowshoeing. Portions of the trail are suitable for, and are used for, backcountry skiing. Site-specific activities enjoyed along the route include hunting, fishing, boating, and swimming.

Intersecting trails
The Metacomet-Monadnock Trail in southern New Hampshire and central Massachusetts continues south where the MSGT leaves off. This extends the overall hiking possibilities another  via the Metacomet-Monadnock Trail and its logical extensions, the Metacomet and Mattabesett Trails in Connecticut. To the north, the Sunapee-Ragged-Kearsarge Greenway Trail continues from the northern terminus of the MSG via a  loop trail to Mount Kearsarge, Ragged Mountain, Bog Mountain and back to Mount Sunapee.

History 
The MSG was first suggested by Allen Chamberlain, president of the Appalachian Mountain Club, in 1919 and was laid out in 1921 by the Society for the Protection of New Hampshire Forests (SPNHF). But the hurricane of 1938 and World War II "effectively ended the original trail; it was not maintained again." The trail was re-established after a study by the SPNHF in 1974.

Hiking the trail
 
The MSG is blazed with white rectangles. It is regularly maintained, and is considered moderately difficult hiking. Mount Monadnock is regarded as a challenging hike for novice hikers during favorable weather conditions. As the crow flies, the MSGT route is never more than a mile or two from a public road, however, cliffs and steep terrain make access much more difficult in some areas. Trail descriptions are available from a number of commercial and non-commercial sources, and a complete guidebook with topographic maps is published by the Monadnock-Sunapee Greenway Trail Club.

Weather along the MSG is typical of southern New Hampshire.  Conditions on exposed hill tops and summits may be harsher during cold or stormy weather. Weather atop the exposed and isolated  summit of Mount Monadnock can be much more severe than conditions below; high winds are common year round and winter storms on the summit can be life-threatening. Lightning is a hazard on exposed peaks and ledges during thunderstorms. Snow is common in the winter and may necessitate the use of cross country skis or snowshoes. Ice can form on exposed ledges and summits, making hiking dangerous without special equipment. Snow and ice tend to linger on Mount Monadnock well into the spring.  

Biting insects can be bothersome during warm weather. Parasitic deer ticks (which are known to carry Lyme disease) are a potential hazard. The trail passes through black bear habitat, although problems with bears are rare. More likely are problem encounters with domestic dogs. Skunks, raccoons, and porcupines are common and active after dark. Poisonous snakes are considered extinct along the route. Poison ivy is uncommon on the MSGT and it does not thrive on Mount Monadnock at all. Some water sources along the trail flow through inhabited areas or swamps and may be contaminated.

Camping
Vehicle-accessible campgrounds with basic amenities are located off the MSG via side trails at Monadnock State Park on the south side of Mount Monadnock, and at Mount Sunapee State Park and Pillsbury State Park on the west side of Sunapee Ridge. The MSGTC maintains several backcountry campsites and fourlean-tos available to backpackers. Campfires are generally prohibited on the MSG, except in established fire rings in state park campgrounds.

See also
Metacomet-Monadnock Trail

References

External links 

 NH Division of Parks & Recreation: Monadnock State Park
 Mount Monadnock State Park Trail Map
 New Hampshire Metacomet-Monadnock Trail
 Metacomet-Monadnock Trail
 Monadnock Conservancy
 Monadnock-Sunapee Greenway Trail Club
 Society for the Protection of New Hampshire Forests
 Harris Center for Conservation Education
 Monadnock Conservancy
 The Nature Conservancy: Otter Brook/ Andorra Forest
 Pillsbury State Park
 Pillsbury State Park map
 Mount Sunapee State Park
 Ausbon Sargent Land Preservation Trust
 Sunapee-Ragged-Kearsarge Greenway

Hiking trails in New Hampshire
Long-distance trails in the United States